The Toshiba Libretto W100 is a dual-touchscreen computer from the Toshiba Libretto series.

History 
The W100 was released for the 25th anniversary of Toshiba in the laptop industry. It was released in July 2010.

Specifications 

 Windows 7
 Two capacitive touchscreens
 Intel Pentium U5400

Reception 
Engadget noted that the software was unstable in an early model. Techradar noted that the model is "on the chunky size". Popular Mechanics noted the clever design. ZDnet noted the high price tag.

Further developments 
Later in 2010, Acer also developed a laptop with two touchscreens.

References

External links 

 User manual of the Toshiba Libretto W100

Libretto W100
Tablet computers introduced in 2010